Daniel Matriculation Higher Secondary School is located in Korukkupet, North Chennai It was established in 1995 by Chev Kovilpillai. Although the land was originally intended for business activities, it was developed into a school due to the high population of illiterate individuals Korukkupet.

Sources 

https://www.danielmatric.in

High schools and secondary schools in Chennai